Zdeněk Žára (3 March 1932 – 16 November 2002) was a rower who represented Czechoslovakia. He competed at the 1956 European Rowing Championships in Bled, Yugoslavia, with the men's eight where they won the gold medal. The same team went to the 1956 Summer Olympics in Melbourne with the men's eight where they were eliminated in the semi-final.

References

1932 births
2002 deaths
Czechoslovak male rowers
Olympic rowers of Czechoslovakia
Rowers at the 1956 Summer Olympics
European Rowing Championships medalists